Gerald Ward may refer to:

Gerald Ward (cricketer) (1877–1914),  English cricketer and British Army officer
Gerald Ward (biker) (born 1948), Canadian criminal
Gerald Ward, actor in the 1915 film The Warrens of Virginia

See also
Gerry Ward (disambiguation)